The Financial Services Action Plan (FSAP) is a key component of the European Union's attempt to create a single market for financial services. Created in 1999 and to last for a period of six years, it contained 42 articles related to the harmonisation of the financial services markets within the European Union. It was scheduled to be completed by the end of 2004.

Description 

The European Council held in Cardiff in June 1998 requested the European Commission "to table a framework for action....to improve the single market in financial services, in particular examining the effectiveness of implementation of current legislation and identifying weaknesses which may require amending legislation".

The European Commission responded with five imperatives for action that were agreed at the Vienna European Council in December 1998, and the Financial Services Action Plan was issued by the European Commission on 11 May 1999.

The cornerstone of the action plan's achievement is the Markets in Financial Instruments Directive (MIFID).

References

External links
European Commission, Financial Services Action Plan
Bank of England, FSAP Overview 

Finance in the European Union
Action plans